Galagania is a genus of flowering plants belonging to the family Apiaceae.

Its native range is Central Asia to Afghanistan.

Species:

Galagania ferganensis 
Galagania fragrantissima 
Galagania gracilis 
Galagania neglecta 
Galagania tenuisecta

References

Apioideae
Apioideae genera